Gabilan (Spanish: Gabilán, meaning "Sparrow hawk") was a former settlement in Monterey County, California. In Spanish, gavilán (gabilán is an older spelling) means "sparrow hawk". Hawks, especially the red-tailed hawk, are common in the area.

A post office operated at Gabilan (having been transferred from Alisal) from 1869 to 1883, and from 1898 to 1900.

References

Former settlements in Monterey County, California
Salinas Valley